The Z63/64 Beijing-Changchun Through Train is Chinese railway running between the capital Beijing to Changchun, capital of Jilin express passenger trains by the Shenyang Railway Bureau, Changchun passenger segment responsible for passenger transport task, Changchun originating on the Beijing train. 25T Type Passenger trains running along the Jingha Railway across Jilin, Liaoning, Hebei, Tianjin, Beijing and other provinces and cities, the entire 1002 km. Beijing railway station to Changchun railway station running 9 hours and 26 minutes, use trips for Z63; Changchun railway station to Beijing railway station to run 9 hours and 21 minutes, use trips for Z64.

Carriages

Locomotives

Timetable

See also 
Z61/62 Beijing-Changchun Through Train
D19/20 Beijing-Changchun Through Train
D23/24 Beijing-Changchun Through Train
G399/400 Beijing-Changchun Through Train

References 

Passenger rail transport in China
Rail transport in Beijing
Rail transport in Jilin